Pilgrims on the Heart Road is an album by Peter Ostroushko, released in 1997. It is the second of the three albums Ostroushko calls his "heartland trilogy" — Heart of the Heartland, Pilgrims on the Heart Road, and Sacred Heart.

Guests include Prudence Johnson, Butch Thompson and Bobby McFerrin.

Reception

Writing for Allmusic, music critic William Ruhlman complimented the instrumental work, but wrote that in contrast to Ostroushko's previous albums, this album is "...a collection of songs with vocals, songs that treat a number of personal and political issues of obvious importance to the musician and which he treats at length... Ostroushko is as determined to display his instrumental dexterity on guitar and mandolin as he is to explore the lyrical subject matter... All of this makes for an ambitious, seriously intended album that sometimes comes off as preachy and self-important, sincere as it may be."

Track listing 
All songs by Peter Ostroushko.
"Miracle" – 6:50
"Mandela" – 8:34
"Twilight of Our Years" – 6:00
"My People" –  6:08
"Down on the Plain of Reeds" – 9:30
"Once Again" – 6:30
"I'm So Glad You Came into My Life" – 6:30
"You Don't Know What Lonely Is" – 6:47
"Baby, Bring Your Sweet Lovin' to Me" – 6:44
"Like Memories Often Do" – 7:15

Personnel
Peter Ostroushko – vocals, guitar, mandolin, fiddle
Prudence Johnson – vocals
Bobby McFerrin – vocals
Richard Dworsky – piano, Hammond organ
Jim Anton – bass
Dean Magraw – acoustic and electric guitar, slide guitar
Gordon Johnson – bass, double bass
Gordon Knudtson – drums
Bruce Kurnow – harmonica
Butch Thompson – clarinet
Bruce Allard	 Trumpet
Marc Anderson – percussion
Diane Tremaine – cello
Ed Volker – piano
Leslie Ball – vocals
Jearlyn Steele Battle – vocals
Kathleen Bradford – vocals
Pat Frederick – vocals
Marge Ostroushko – vocals
Karen Paurus – vocals
Robert Robinson – vocals

Production notes
Produced and mixed by Peter Ostroushko
Executive Producer – Eric Peltoniemi
Craig Thorson – assistant Engineer
Gus Gustafson, Dan Corrigan – photography
Tom Mudge – engineer, mixing
Lisa Ekström – design

References

1997 albums
Peter Ostroushko albums
Red House Records albums